Jump Rope Gazers is the second studio album by New Zealand indie rock band the Beths. It was released on 10 July 2020 through Carpark Records.

Track listing

Charts

References

2020 albums
The Beths albums
Carpark Records albums